Pen yr Helgi Du (Head or Hill of the Black Hound) is a mountain peak in the eastern part of the Carneddau in Snowdonia, Wales.

It lies on the south-eastern flanks of Carnedd Llewelyn, and is linked to Carnedd Llewelyn over the col of Bwlch Eryl Farchog, a knife-edge ridge over the cliffs of Craig Yr Ysfa.

From here the walker can drop down into Cwm Eigiau to the east or to the Ffynnon Llugwy reservoir to the south. Continuing over Pen yr Helgi Du to the east you will reach the even more beautifully named Pen Llithrig y Wrach (the slippery peak of the witch).

References

External links
 www.geograph.co.uk : photos of Pen yr Helgi Du and surrounding area

Mountains and hills of Snowdonia
Hewitts of Wales
Nuttalls
Mountains and hills of Conwy County Borough
Capel Curig